In mathematical logic, the intersection type discipline is a branch of type theory encompassing type systems that use the intersection type constructor  to assign multiple types to a single term.
In particular, if a term  can be assigned both the type  and the type , then  can be assigned the intersection type  (and vice versa).
Therefore, the intersection type constructor can be used to express finite heterogeneous ad hoc polymorphism (as opposed to parametric polymorphism).
For example, the λ-term  can be assigned the type  in most intersection type systems, assuming for the term variable  both the function type  and the corresponding argument type .

Prominent intersection type systems include the Coppo–Dezani type assignment system, the Barendregt-Coppo–Dezani type assignment system, and the essential intersection type assignment system.
Most strikingly, intersection type systems are closely related to (and often exactly characterize) normalization properties of λ-terms under β-reduction.

In programming languages, such as TypeScript and Scala, intersection types are used to express ad hoc polymorphism.

History 
The intersection type discipline was pioneered by Mario Coppo, Mariangiola Dezani-Ciancaglini, Patrick Sallé, and Garrel Pottinger.
The underlying motivation was to study semantic properties (such as normalization) of the λ-calculus by means of type theory.
While the initial work by Coppo and Dezani established a type theoretic characterization of strong normalization for the λI-calculus, Pottinger extended this characterization to the λK-calculus.
In addition, Sallé contributed the notion of the universal type  that can be assigned to any λ-term, thereby corresponding to the empty intersection.
Using the universal type  allowed for a fine-grained analysis of head normalization, normalization, and strong normalization.
In collaboration with Henk Barendregt, a filter λ-model for an intersection type system was given, tying intersection types ever more closely to λ-calculus semantics.

Due to the correspondence with normalization, typability in prominent intersection type systems (excluding the universal type) is undecidable.
Complementarily, undecidability of the dual problem of type inhabitation in prominent intersection type systems was proven by Paweł Urzyczyn.
Later, this result was refined showing exponential space completeness of rank 2 intersection type inhabitation and undecidability of rank 3 intersection type inhabitation.
Remarkably, principal type inhabitation is decidable in polynomial time.

Coppo–Dezani type assignment system 
The Coppo–Dezani type assignment system  extends the simply typed λ-calculus by allowing multiple types to be assumed for a term variable.

Term language 

Type language 
 
The intersection type constructor is taken modulo associativity, commutativity and idempotence.

Typing rules 

Properties 
 Normalization: If , then  has a β-normal form.
If the type language is extended to contain the empty intersection, i.e. , 
then  is closed under β-equality and is sound and complete for inference semantics.

Barendregt–Coppo–Dezani type assignment system 
The Barendregt–Coppo–Dezani type assignment system  extends the Coppo–Dezani type assignment system in the following three aspects:
  introduces the universal type constant  (akin to the empty intersection) that can be assigned to any λ-term.
  allows the intersection type constructor  to appear on the right-hand side of the arrow type constructor .
  introduces the intersection type subtyping  partial order on types together with a corresponding typing rule.

Term language 

Type language 

Intersection type subtyping 
Intersection type subtyping  is defined as the smallest preorder (reflexive and transitive relation) over intersection types satisfying the following properties:
 
Intersection type subtyping is decidable in quadratic time.

Typing rules 

Properties 
 Semantics:  is sound and complete wrt. a filter λ-model, in which the interpretation of a λ-term coincides with the set of types that can be assigned to it.
 Principal pairs: If  is strongly normalizing, then there exists a principal pair  such that for any typing  the pair  can be obtained from the principal pair  by means of type expansions, liftings, and substitutions.

References

Type theory
Type systems
Lambda calculus
Theory of computation
Polymorphism (computer science)